William Bernard Raymond Lickorish (born 19 February 1938) is a mathematician. He is emeritus professor of geometric topology in the Department of Pure Mathematics and Mathematical Statistics, University of Cambridge, and also an emeritus fellow of Pembroke College, Cambridge. His research interests include topology and knot theory. He was one of the discoverers of the HOMFLY polynomial invariant of links, and  proved the Lickorish-Wallace theorem which states that all closed orientable 3-manifolds can be obtained by Dehn surgery on a link.

Education 
Lickorish received his Ph.D from Cambridge in 1964; his thesis was written under the supervision of Christopher Zeeman.

Recognition and awards 
In 1991, Lickorish received the Senior Whitehead Prize from the London Mathematical Society. Lickorish and Kenneth Millett won the 1991 Chauvenet Prize for their paper "The New Polynomial Invariants of Knots and Links".
Lickorish was included in the 2019 class of fellows of the American Mathematical Society "for contributions to knot theory and low-dimensional topology".

Selected publications

See also
Lickorish twist theorem
Lickorish–Wallace theorem

References

1935 births
Living people
20th-century British mathematicians
21st-century British mathematicians
Topologists
Fellows of Pembroke College, Cambridge
Cambridge mathematicians
Fellows of the American Mathematical Society
Whitehead Prize winners